The Trinity Church ( or Церковь Троицы Живоначальной) was a Russian Orthodox church in Novocherkassk, Rostov Oblast, Russia.

History
The first wooden Trinity church was constructed on Troitskaya (Trinity) square in 1810. After some decades passed, in 1830, the church fence collapsed.

In 1835, parishioners began to appeal to church authorities about the need to build a stone church. The project of a two-story stone church was drafted by architect Sedov in January 1845. Yet St. Petersburg Main Office of Public Buildings and Railways sent to Novocherkassk its own project of the Trinity Church. The city government refused both projects because of their small capacity, and decided to create a new one. Architect Fomin, who compiled a project of a tripartite, five-domed, Byzantine-style church was asked to draft an appropriate project, which was later finished and approved on August 2, 1845.

Only five years later, on June 24, 1850, with the blessing of the Archbishop of Don and Novocherkassk, Ioann Dobrozrakov, a solemn laying of the stone church was done. In 1856 the church was completed. Icons for iconostasis were painted by local artists Ardalion Zolotarev and Mikhail Golmov. The consecration of the Trinity Church took place on May 30, 1859.

In June 1869, construction of brick belfry and stone refectory began. Until 1896 there were only two altars in the church ― the main one (Troitsky) and southern one (Vozdvizhensky), In 1896 the third, northern one (Pokrovsky) was arranged. In 1897, near the church a two-story building for a girls' school was opened, and in another building there was a parochial school.

As of 1915, the Novocherkassk Trinity Church was five-domed, had a stone bell tower, and consisted of two floors. The main dome had a conical shape with eight windows. The crosses on the chapels of the church were made of iron, but were also gilded. In the lower tier of bell tower there were ten bells. The refectory of the Trinity Church was very spacious - 12 meters long, 8.5 meters wide and 9.6 meters high. At the entrance to the church on the right and left sides were the choirs.

The Trinity Church was closed in the mid-1930s during a massive anti-religious campaign. Shortly after it was destroyed..

References

External links 
 Trinity Church on sobory.ru

Churches in Rostov Oblast
Churches completed in 1856
Buildings and structures in Novocherkassk
Demolished churches in the Soviet Union
Russian Orthodox church buildings in Russia